Frank Johnston may refer to:

 Frank Johnston (artist) (1888–1949), visual artist and member of the Group of Seven
 Frank Johnston (politician) (born 1929), politician in Manitoba, Canada
 Frank Johnston (priest) (born 1930), Anglican priest and military chaplain
 Frank Johnston (rugby league), Australian rugby league player

See also
 Francis Johnston (disambiguation)
 Frank Johnson (disambiguation)
 Francis Johnson (disambiguation)